Mariano Rubio (14 November 1931–4 October 1999) was a Spanish economist who served as the governor of Bank of Spain in the period 1984–1992. He involved in a scandal known as Ibercorp incident and was forced to resign from the office.

Early life and education
Rubio was born in Burgos on 14 November 1931. He studied law, but he did not complete his studies. He later graduated from the University of Madrid receiving a bachelor's degree in economics. During his undergraduate studies he was part of the University Socialist Association and arrested due to his anti-Francoist activities.

Career
Following his release from the prison Rubio left Spain for Paris where he worked at the Organization for Economic Cooperation and Development. He returned to Spain in 1963 and began to work at the treasury. In 1965 he was appointed deputy director of the research department of the Bank of Spain. Ángel Madroñero, the head of the department, was instrumental in his appointment.

In 1970 he became general director of financial policy department of the ministry of finance, and remained in the office until 1972 when he resigned. Next year he was named the head of Enagás company. Between 1977 and 1984 he was deputy governor of the Bank of Spain. In July 1984 he succeeded J. R. Álvarez Rendueles as governor of the bank. Rubio's appointment was supported by the Economy Minister Carlos Solchaga. In July 1992 Rubio had to resign from the office due to his involvement in a scandal known as Ibercorp case and was replaced by Luis Angel Rojo in the post. Rubio was accused of employing some confidential information to gain dividends in the stock market.

During his tenure as governor of the bank Spanish credit market was radically transformed and became much more liberal than the previous periods.

Later years, personal life and death
Following the Ibercorp case Carlos Solchaga resigned from the office. Miguel Boyer also implicated in the case, and both Boyer and Rubio in addition to others, including their wives, were taken to the court. Rubio arrested and jailed due to his involvement in the scandal in 1994. 

Rubio married twice. He first married Isabel Azcárate. His second wife was Uruguay-born author Carmen Posadas with who he wed in January 1988. He died of colon cancer in Madrid on 4 October 1999.

References

External links

20th-century  Spanish economists
1931 births
1999 deaths
Deaths from colorectal cancer
Deaths from cancer in Spain
Governors of the Bank of Spain
Spanish prisoners and detainees
People from Burgos